People's Party, Peoples Party or Popular Party may refer to one of the following political parties.

Translations into English of the names of the various countries' parties are not always consistent, but People's Party is the most common.

Current
 Armenia:
 People's Party (Armenia) (current)
 People's Party of Armenia (current)
 Aruban People's Party (founded 1942, AVP)
 Austrian People's Party (founded 1945, (ÖVP)
 Cambodian People's Party (founded 1951, CPP)
 People's Party for Reconstruction and Democracy in the Democratic Republic of the Congo (founded 2002, PPRD)
 People's Party of Canada (founded 2018)
 Croatia:
 Croatian People's Party – Liberal Democrats (founded 1990, (HNS)
 Croatian Popular Party (founded 1997, HPS)
 National People's Party (Curaçao) (founded 1947, PNP)
 Czechoslovak People's Party (founded 1919, ČSL)
 Botswana People's Party
 Denmark:
 Danish People's Party (disambiguation) (DF), several parties
 Conservative People's Party (Denmark) (founded 1916, DKF)
 Socialist People's Party (Denmark) (SF)
 People Party, Egypt (founded 2012)
 Conservative People's Party of Estonia (founded 2012, EKRE)
 European People's Party (founded 1976, EPP)
 People's Party (Faroe Islands) (founded 1939)
 Swedish People's Party of Finland (founded 1906)
 People's Party (Greenland)
 People's Party of Guinea (current)
 Guinean People's Party, Guinea-Bissau (founded 2000, PPG)
 New People's Party (Hong Kong) (founded 2011, NPP)
 People's Party (Iceland, 2016)
 India:
 Janata Dal (Secular) or People's Party (Secular), founded in 1999
 Janata Dal (United)  or People's Party (United), founded in 2003
 Bharatiya Janata Party or Indian People's Party (BJP), founded in 1980
 Aam Aadmi Party or Common Man Party (AAP), founded in 2012
 Iraq:
 People's Party or People's Party for Reform, founded in 2011
 Italy:
 Sardinian People's Party
 South Tyrolean People's Party
 People's Party of Kazakhstan
 Peoples Party of Kenya

 Liberian People's Party
 Malaysia:
 Parti Rakyat Malaysia or Malaysian People's Party, PRM
 Parti Rakyat Sarawak or Sarawak People's Party, PRS
 People's Party (Malawi)
 Mongolian People's Party
 People's Party for Freedom and Democracy, in the Netherlands
 People's Party (Montenegro)
 All Nigeria Peoples Party
 Norwegian People's Party
 People's Party (Northern Cyprus)
 Palestinian People's Party
 Malawi:
 People's Party (Malawi)
 Pakistan:
 Pakistan Peoples Party
 Pakistan Peoples Party (Shaheed Bhutto)
 People's Party (Panama)
 People's Party (Papua New Guinea)
 Polish People's Party
 CDS – People's Party in Portugal (founded 1974)
 People's Party (Puerto Rico)
 People's Party (Samoa)
 Sammarinese Populars (founded 2003, PS)
 People's Party (Serbia, 2017)
 People's Party (Seychelles)
 Sierra Leone People's Party
 Singapore People's Party
 Kotleba – People's Party Our Slovakia
 Slovenian People's Party
 South Korea:
 People's Party (South Korea, 2016)
 People's Party (South Korea, 2017)
 People Party (South Korea)
 People's Party of South Ossetia
 Spain:
 People's Party (Spain)
 People's Party (Spain, 1976)
 Liberal People's Party (Sweden) (founded 1934, L)
 Switzerland:
 Swiss People's Party
 Evangelical People's Party of Switzerland
 Christian Democratic People's Party of Switzerland
 Taiwan People's Party
 People's Party of Tibet
 People's Party (Ukraine)
 Movement for a People's Party, United States (founded 2017)

Historical
 Australia:
 Australian People's Party
 Queensland People's Party
 People's Party (Victoria)
 Austria:
 German People's Party (Austria)
 Trentino People's Party
 Belarusian Popular Party
 Belgium:
 Christene Volkspartij,
 Christian Social Party (Belgium, defunct)
 People's Party (Belgium), PP)
 Popular Party (British Guiana)
 People's Party (Bulgaria)
 Burundi:
 Party of the People (1959–????, PP)
 People's Party (Burundi) (1992–????, PP)
 People's Party (Burma)
 People's Party of Catalonia (1973)
 East Turkestan People's Revolutionary Party, in China
 Croatia:
 People's Party (Kingdom of Croatia) (1840–1918)
 People's Party (Dalmatia) (1861–1905)
 Croatian Popular Party (1919) (1919–1929)
 People's Party (Cuba)
 Finland:
 People's Party (Finland, 1917), see list of political parties in Finland
 People's Party (Finland, 1932)
 Gambian People's Party
 Germany:
 Bavarian People's Party
 German People's Party (1868) (1868–1910)
 German People's Party (1918–1933)
 Wendish People's Party
 German National People's Party
 All-German People's Party

 Conservative People's Party (Germany)

 Saxon People's Party

 People's Party (Greece)
 Popular Party (Guam)
 People's Party (Guatemala)
 People's Party (Iceland)
 Janata Party or People's Party, India (1977–2013)
 Italy:
 Italian People's Party (1919)
 Italian People's Party (1994)
 Trentino Tyrolean People's Party
 Iran:
 Party of the Iranian People
 People's Party (Iran)
 People's Party (Iraq)
 People's Party (Latvia)
 Popular Socialist Party (Mexico)
 People's Party (Montenegro, 1906)
 Populist Party (Northern Cyprus)
 Netherlands:
 Roman Catholic People's Party
 Evangelical People's Party (Netherlands)
 Poland:
 People's Party (Poland)

 Conservative People's Party (Poland)
 Romania:
 People's Party (interwar Romania)
 German People's Party (Romania)
 People's Party (Romania, 2005–06)
 People's Party – Dan Diaconescu
 People's Party of the Russian Federation
 Samoa All People's Party
 Serbia:
 People's Party (Serbia, 1990), had Milan Paroški as president
 People's Party (Serbia, 2008), founded by Maja Gojković
 Peoples Party (Sierra Leone)
 Slovak People's Party
 South Africa:
 Het Volk (political party)
 Volksparty
 South Korea:
 People's Party of Korea (1945–1947)
 People's Party (South Korea, 1963)
 People's Party (South Korea, 1967)
 People's Party (South Korea, 1990)
 Spain:
 People's Party (Spain, 1976)
 People's Party of Catalonia (1973)
 People's Party (Syria)
 Taiwanese People's Party (1927–1931)
 Khana Ratsadon, in Thailand (1927–1957)
 Tonga People's Party
 People's Party (Turkey), more commonly known as the Populist Party (Turkey) (1983–1985)
 United Kingdom:
 British People's Party (disambiguation), several parties, all far-right
 PEOPLE Party (1972–1975)
 People's Justice Party (UK) (1998–2006)
 United States:
 People's Party (United States) (1891–1908)
 People's Party (United States, 1971)
 People's Party (Illinois) (1873–1875)
 People's Party (Indiana)
 People's Party (Utah) (1870–1891)

See also

 Partido Popular (disambiguation)
 Populist Party (disambiguation)
 People's Movement (disambiguation)
 British People's Party (disambiguation)
 Danish People's Party (disambiguation)
 German People's Party (disambiguation)
 Conservative People's Party (disambiguation)
 Democratic People's Party (disambiguation)
 Liberal People's Party (disambiguation)
 People's Democratic Party (disambiguation)
 People's Labour Party (disambiguation)
 People's Republican Party (disambiguation)
 Republican People's Party (disambiguation)
 Socialist People's Party (disambiguation)
 Sinmindang (disambiguation), literally "New People's Party" in Korean language
 Popular Action Party (disambiguation)
 Popular Democrat Party (disambiguation)
 Popular Democratic Party (disambiguation)
 Popular National Party (disambiguation)
 Popular Socialist Party (disambiguation)
 Popular Unity Party (disambiguation)